Acácio Alfredo Casimiro (born 24 March 1949 in Lisbon) is a Portuguese former football midfielder and manager.

External links

1949 births
Living people
Footballers from Lisbon
Portuguese footballers
Association football midfielders
Primeira Liga players
Liga Portugal 2 players
S.C. Espinho players
Boavista F.C. players
F.C. Famalicão players
U.S.C. Paredes players
Amarante F.C. players
Portuguese football managers
Primeira Liga managers
Liga Portugal 2 managers
U.S.C. Paredes managers
C.F. Estrela da Amadora managers
Leixões S.C. managers
F.C. Famalicão managers
S.C. Freamunde managers
Kuwait Premier League managers
Kazma SC managers
Al-Muharraq SC managers
Raja CA managers
Sanat Naft Abadan F.C. managers
Chinese Super League managers
Henan Songshan Longmen F.C. managers
Premier League of Bosnia and Herzegovina managers
FK Sloboda Tuzla managers
Portuguese expatriate football managers
Expatriate football managers in Tunisia
Expatriate football managers in Kuwait
Expatriate football managers in Bahrain
Expatriate football managers in Morocco
Expatriate football managers in Libya
Expatriate football managers in Jordan
Expatriate football managers in Iran
Expatriate football managers in China
Expatriate football managers in Bosnia and Herzegovina
Portuguese expatriate sportspeople in Tunisia
Portuguese expatriate sportspeople in Kuwait
Portuguese expatriate sportspeople in Bahrain
Portuguese expatriate sportspeople in Morocco
Portuguese expatriate sportspeople in Jordan
Portuguese expatriate sportspeople in Iran
Portuguese expatriate sportspeople in China
Portuguese expatriate sportspeople in Bosnia and Herzegovina
Botola managers